Caitriona Palmer (born 1972) is an Irish journalist, author, human rights investigator and advocate, born and raised in County Dublin, Ireland.

Education 
Palmer studied at University College Dublin, where she received a bachelor's degree in history and politics in 1993.

In 1995, she won a Fulbright Scholarship to complete her master's at Boston College.

In 2021, Palmer was awarded the UCD Alumni Award in Social Sciences.

Career 
From 2002 to 2004, Palmer was the Iran correspondent for The Irish Times based in Tehran.

Palmer is the author of two books, the memoir, An Affair With My Mother: A Story of Adoption, Secrecy and Love (Penguin, 2016) and Climate Justice (Bloomsbury, 2018), co-written with former president of Ireland, Mary Robinson

References

External links

Living people
Irish journalists
Irish women journalists
The Irish Times people
People from County Dublin
Alumni of University College Dublin
Boston College alumni
1972 births